40-Point Demands were given to Nepalese Prime Minister Sher Bahadur Deuba by Baburam Bhattarai on 4 February 1996 in Singha Durbar. Bhattarai said that if the demands were not met by 17 February, he would launch a war against the government. As their demands were not met, subsequently, they launched the Nepalese Civil War on 13 February.

References

External links 

 List of 40 demands

1996 in Nepal
Nepalese Civil War
1996 crimes in Nepal